Studio Limited Editions was a brand name or artist label that was attached to a range of various media products that were sold through UK and overseas high street retail stores from 2005 to 2008. These stores were establishments such as Art galleries (such as Castle Galleries), Print retailers (such as Athena), Garden centres (such as Dobbies) and Gift shops (such as Menkind).'The brand was also available through major mail order companies such as The Park Group, Express Gifts and the Ideal World TV Shopping Channel.

The label ceased to be in 2008 when its parent company folded due to issues associated with the credit crunch. It may appear under new ownership at some point in the future.

Publications
Iconic Media Publishing produced artworks under the Studio Limited Editions label, in 20 inch x 16, 16 inch x 12 inch, 12 inch x 12 inch and A4 sized mounted formats and included iconic music, movie, sport and historic photography in their limited edition production runs. The limited editions were either signed by the photographer, autographed by the featured topic or were authenticated by company signatures.

Photographers
Many of the limited edition photographic artworks published were signed by the photographer.

The photographers, amongst many others, included
 Philip Townsend (The photographer of The Rolling Stones first published photos and The Beatles private meeting with the Maharishi) His own website being www.philiptownsend.com He died in 2016.
 Adrian Boot (A staff photographer with "The NME and Melody Maker, the British weekly music papers) his website being www.urbanimage.com
 David Plastik (A freelance contributor to both "Creem and Billboard" American music magazines)His website being www.80srockphotos.com
 Alan Perry ( A freelance contributor to the British Kerrang! heavy rock publication) His website being www.concertphotosuk.com

These photographers photographs covered may of the leading musicians from the 1960s throughout to the 1980s.

The topics that were featured under the Studio Limited Editions signed photographer range featured, amongst many others, bands such as
AC/DC
The Beatles 
Blondie
David Bowie
The Clash
Bob Dylan
Guns N' Roses
Kiss
Led Zeppelin
Bob Marley and the Wailers
The Ramones
The Rolling Stones
The Sex Pistols
Stevie Ray Vaughan
The Stranglers
Bruce Springsteen
U2
The Who

Each of these editions was a 12 x 10 inch photograph, mounted within a 20 x 16 inch mount. Individual mounts were then signed by the photographers and they were numbered accordingly.
The parent company folded prior to these editions selling out and therefore early signed editions have become very sought after with some selling at auction for a few hundred pounds (on eBay in 2009).

The label also published a range of autographed photographic artworks. These were again, photographs sized 12 x 10 inches mounted within a 20 x 16 inch mount. These autograph editions featured some of Britain's most notorious gangsters and these included
 Freddie Foreman who was known as a leading underworld figure during the 1960s and is now an author. The film The Long Good Friday's main character is reputedly based on him.
 Roy Shaw is known for being one of the 1970s leading unlicensed boxing figures as well as a time serving criminal. He died in 2012.
 Joey Pyle was known for being one of the UK's leading crime figures during the 1960s and 1970s and for his book, notorious and DVD "Crime doesn't pay but the hours are good". He died in 2007.
 Howard Marks known for his views on the drugs trade being one of the world's biggest drugs barons during the 1970s and for his DVD  Mr Nice, his books, Mr. Nice, Howard Marks' Book of Dope Stories, and Señor Nice: Straight Life from Wales to South America and for his media appearances. He died in 2016.
 Eric Mason known for being a member of the infamous Krays firm and for being the last person in Britain to be birched. he also wrote a book called the brutal truth. He died in 2012.
 Dave Courtney known for being a gangster in his previous life but now an advocate of straight living and a successful author, with his books stop the ride I want to get off, .... the ride, raving lunacy and the rides back on. He is an actor in a number of movies such as triads yardies onion barges, six bend trap, clubbing to death and killer bitch. He is also a television and media personality.

Only 50 of each of these autographed limited editions (featuring these underworld figures) were released out of a planned 500 strictly limited edition run. Subsequently, these signed editions have become quite sought after.

Artists
They also published a number of artists who produced a pencil drawing range under the title The Rock Archive Collection''. This collection featured 12 of the world's most well known musicians who were known for their guitar work and songwriting skills. The musicians featured in this 12 piece collection were, Keith Richards, Jimi Hendrix, George Harrison, John Lennon, Ronnie Wood, David Gilmour, Neil Young, Jimmy Page, Pete Townshend, Bob Dylan, Eric Clapton and a twelfth print which was never released.

These artists included
 Diana Monroe
 Kate Brown
 George Adams
 Daniel Shepherd

The pencil drawing collections also featured sports figures, popular music figures and historic figures.

References 

Publishing companies of the United Kingdom